Suez S.A., known from 1997 to 2001 as Suez-Lyonnaise des eaux, was a leading French multinational corporation headquartered in the 8th arrondissement of Paris, with operations primarily in water, electricity and natural gas supply, and waste management. In the early 2000s Suez also owned some media and telecommunications assets, but has since divested these. According to the Masons Water Yearbook 2004/5, Suez served 117.4 million people around the world. The company conducted a merger of equals with fellow utility company Gaz de France on 22 July 2008 to form GDF Suez (called Engie since 2015). The water and waste assets of Suez were spun off into a separate publicly traded company, Suez Environnement.

History
Its form prior to the GDF merger was the result of nearly two centuries of reorganisation and corporate mergers. Its most recent name comes from the involvement of one of its several founding entities – the Compagnie universelle du canal maritime de Suez – in building the Suez Canal in the mid-19th century.

Merger with Gaz de France
On February 25, 2006, French Prime minister Dominique de Villepin announced the merger of Suez and Gaz de France, which would make the world's largest liquefied natural gas company. The revenue of GDF was around 22.4 billion euros in 2005, compared to 41.5 billion for Suez. The CGT trade-union called the merger a  "disguised privatization."

On 3 September 2007, Gaz de France and Suez announced agreed terms of merger. The deal was conducted on the basis of an exchange of 21 Gaz de France shares for 22 Suez shares via the absorption of Suez by Gaz de France. The French state holds more than 35% of shares of the merged company, GDF Suez. As a consequence of the conditions posed by the European Commission with regards to allowing the merger, on 29 May 2008 Suez sold its Belgian gas supplier Distrigas to the Italian company Eni for €2.7 billion. On 22 July 2008 the group GDF Suez, a company of €74 billion of annual turnover, was officially created.

Major subsidiaries

Now part of Engie 
 Suez Energy International – energy
 Electrabel – electricity in Europe (first in Belgium)
 Tractebel Engineering – international engineering consultancy
  – building services/facilities management

Now part of SUEZ
 Sita — waste management
 Suez Environnement — water and waste
 Degrémont — water and wastewater treatment engineering
 United Water — water in the United States, also Adelaide, Australia
 Grupo Agbar — water and waste
 Purite Ltd - water purification company
 GE Water and Process Technologies-Ionics-Ecolochem-ZENON-Osmonics
 Driplex Water Engineering Pvt. Ltd. 
 Driplex Water Engineering International Pvt. Ltd

See also

References

External links

 

Engie
Energy companies established in 1858
Energy companies disestablished in 2008
Defunct oil and gas companies of France
Defunct electric power companies of France
Waste management companies of France
Company, S.A., Suez (company)
Water companies of France
1858 establishments in France
Privatized companies of France
2008 mergers and acquisitions